The following is a list of gardens in New York City which are open to the public (listed alphabetically):

Bartow-Pell Mansion
British Garden at Hanover Square
Brooklyn Botanic Garden
Central Park Conservatory Garden
The Cloisters
Enid A. Haupt Glass Garden
Fort Tryon Park Garden
Frick Collection Courtyard Gardens
Liz Christy Garden
New York Botanical Garden
Queens Botanical Garden
Staten Island Botanical Garden
Wave Hill
See also: Community gardens in New York City

Gardens
Geography of New York City
New York City
Gardens in New York (state)